Cymindis kocheri is a species of ground beetle in the subfamily Harpalinae. It was described by Antoine in 1939.

References

kocheri
Beetles described in 1939